The Bishop of Sherwood is an episcopal title used by a suffragan bishop of the Church of England Diocese of Southwell and Nottingham, in the Province of York, England. The title takes its name after the Royal forest of Sherwood in Nottinghamshire; the See was erected under the Suffragans Nomination Act 1888 by Order in Council dated 18 May 1965.

List of bishops

References

External links
 Crockford's Clerical Directory - Listings

 
Anglican suffragan bishops in the Diocese of Southwell and Nottingham
Sherwood Forest